Antwerp is a village in Jefferson County, New York, United States. The population was 686 at the 2010 census. The village is in center of the town of Antwerp and is northeast of Watertown.

History 
The village was formerly called "Indian River" due to its location on that river.

Antwerp was incorporated as a village in 1853. The historic core of the village was listed on the National Register of Historic Places in 2001 as the Village of Antwerp Historic District.

Geography

The Indian River, part of the Oswegatchie River watershed, flows through the center of the village.

Demographics

As of the census of 2000, there were 716 people, 260 households, and 166 families residing in the village. The population density was 682.4 people per square mile (263.3/km2). There were 305 housing units at an average density of 290.7 per square mile (112.2/km2). The racial makeup of the village was 96.51% White, 0.28% Black or African American, 0.14% Native American, 0.84% Asian, 0.98% from other races, and 1.26% from two or more races. Hispanic or Latino of any race were 2.93% of the population.

There were 260 households, out of which 35.0% had children under the age of 18 living with them, 48.8% were married couples living together, 10.4% had a female householder with no husband present, and 35.8% were non-families. 28.1% of all households were made up of individuals, and 16.5% had someone living alone who was 65 years of age or older. The average household size was 2.75 and the average family size was 3.40.

In the village, the population was spread out, with 31.4% under the age of 18, 8.4% from 18 to 24, 25.3% from 25 to 44, 22.2% from 45 to 64, and 12.7% who were 65 years of age or older. The median age was 36 years. For every 100 females, there were 94.0 males. For every 100 females age 18 and over, there were 93.3 males.

The median income for a household in the village was $33,472, and the median income for a family was $40,833. Males had a median income of $36,042 versus $23,542 for females. The per capita income for the village was $12,881. About 15.7% of families and 19.2% of the population were below the poverty line, including 26.5% of those under age 18 and 9.2% of those age 65 or over.

References

External links
Village of Antwerp official website
Village of Antwerp Historical District

Villages in New York (state)
Villages in Jefferson County, New York